SMA Engines (Société de Motorisations Aéronautiques) is a French manufacturer of Diesel engines for light aircraft, located in Bourges. A subsidiary of Safran, SMA engine production is currently limited to one model, the SMA SR305-230, which has received a Supplemental Type Certificate for installation in the Cessna 182Q and R. The engine uses standard jet fuel, readily available at airports worldwide.

History
SMA was founded in 1997 as a 50/50 joint venture between SOCATA and Renault Sport to develop a diesel engine for light aircraft. SNECMA also entered the joint venture with a one-third interest in June 2000.  The prefix of the engines changed to SR, for SNECMA-Renault. In 2005, Safran bought out the other partners to become the sole owner of SMA.

On 25 September 2020 Safran announced the sale of the SR305 and SR460 engine programs to Röder Praezision Group GmbH.

Products
 SMA SR305-230 4-cylinder
 SMA SR460 6-cylinder version, in development.

References

External links
 Official SMA website

Aircraft engine manufacturers of France
Companies based in Centre-Val de Loire
Safran Group